The Interamerican Society of Cardiology (SIAC for its Spanish acronym) is a nongovernmental association formed by the National Societies of Cardiology of the American Continent.
The Interamerican Society of Cardiology, together with the European Society of Cardiology, founded in 1950, the Asian Pacific Society of Cardiology, founded in 1956, and the African Society of Cardiology founded in 1981 are the four Intercontinental Professional Societies of Cardiology of the World Heart Federation (WHF for its acronym in English).

History 
The Interamerican Society of Cardiology (SIAC) was founded in Mexico on 18 April 1944, at the initiative of Doctor Ignacio Chávez. That year, the occasion being the inauguration of the National Institute of Cardiology in Mexico City its founder and director, Dr. Ignacio Chávez, invited distinguished cardiologists from North, Central and South America and the Caribbean to the ceremony.

After a fruitful exchange of ideas at this meeting, it was concluded that, in fact, the event had actually constituted an Interamerican Congress and the suggestion was to acknowledge it as such. Those attending did so and decided to form the Interamerican Society of Cardiology and to recognize the event as the first Interamerican Congress of Cardiology. It was also decided to delegate upon Dr. Chavez the task of drawing up the articles of incorporation and bylaws of the Society, and he was requested to convene another Interamerican Congress of Cardiology in Mexico City when World War II ended. Dr. Ignacio Chavez was unanimously elected as President of the Interamerican Society of Cardiology.

Mission 
The main purpose of the Society is to group together the Societies of Cardiology of all the countries of the Americas for the advancement of cardiology, to promote research, teaching and the association of physicians, surgeons, and researchers specialized in this field. It also strives to promote optimal cardiovascular health in the population of the Americas through the education and ongoing professional development of its members.

Vision 
To unite the Cardiovascular Societies representing all the countries of the Americas in order to facilitate the advancement of cardiovascular science, by:
 Promoting research and exchange.
 Supporting graduate level education and ongoing professional development.
 Granting value to being a member of the "Society - SIAC".

General Assembly 

At present there are 26 national professional societies of cardiology members of SIAC forming the General Assembly to bring together more than 40,000 cardiologists.
 Argentina: Argentine Society of Cardiology / Argentine Federation of Cardiology / Argentine Council of Residents of Cardiology
 Bolivia: Bolivian Society of Cardiology
 Brazil: Brazilian Society of Cardiology
 Canada: Canadian Cardiovascular Society
 Caribbean: Caribbean Cardiac Society
 Colombia: Colombian Society of Cardiology and Cardiovascular Surgery
 Costa Rica: Costa Rican Association of Cardiology
 Cuba: Cuban Society of Cardiology
 Chile: Chilean Society of Cardiology and Cardiovascular Surgery
 Dominican Republic: Dominican Society of Cardiology
 Ecuador: Ecuadorian Society of Cardiology
 USA: American Heart Association / American College of Cardiology
 Guatemala: Guatemalan Heart Association
 Honduras: Honduran Society of Cardiology
 Mexico: Mexican Society of Cardiology / National Association of Cardiologists of Mexico
 Nicaragua: Nicaraguan Association of Cardiologists
 Panama: Panamanian Society of Cardiology
 Paraguay: Paraguayan Society of Cardiology
 Peru: Peruvian Society of Cardiology
 Puerto Rico: Puerto Rican Society of Cardiology
 El Salvador: Salvadoran Association of Cardiology
 Uruguay: Uruguayan Society of Cardiology
 Venezuela: Venezuelan Society of Cardiology

Administrative office 

Since the founding of the SIAC and according to the bylaws in force, the Secretary-Treasurer is permanently based at the National Institute of Cardiology in Mexico City.

Interamerican Congress 
The Interamerican Congress of Cardiology is held every two years in a country of the American continent. The XXIV Interamerican Congress of Cardiology held from the 18th to 20 October 2013 in Buenos Aires, Argentina, had 9946 attendees, including cardiologists, teachers and students, of which 781 were foreigners from 22 different countries.

The XXV Interamerican Congress of Cardiology will take place from the 4th to 7 December 2015 in Santiago de Chile. At the last General Assembly the city of São Paulo, Brazil was approved as host of the XXVI Interamerican Congress of Cardiology to be held in 2017.

Councils 
The Interamerican Society of Cardiology currently has the following associations and scientific Councils:
 Association of Echocardiography of the SIAC (EcoSIAC)
 Council of Cardiomyopathies and Chagas Disease
 Council of Electrocardiography and Electrophysiology
 Alliance Against Sudden Cardiac Death
 Council of Epidemiology
 Council of Rheumatic Fever

References
www.siacardio.com
 Bylaws 2008, Buenos Aires Argentina, review 2008.

External links 
 

Heart disease organizations